Dolgovo is a rural locality (a village) in Markovskoye Rural Settlement, Vologodsky District, Vologda Oblast, Russia. The population was 6 as of 2002.

Geography 
The distance to Vologda is 30 km, to Vasilyevskoye is 8 km. Glushitsa, Rogachyovo, Ivanovka are the nearest rural localities.

References 

Rural localities in Vologodsky District